Scala Radio is a classical music digital radio station in the United Kingdom, owned and operated by Bauer Radio since its launch in March 2019. The station broadcasts nationally on DAB via the Sound Digital multiplex and online through websites and apps, including the station's own. The station was the first national classical music service to launch on terrestrial radio in the UK since Classic FM in 1992.

The station's playlist features 70% popular classics and 30% new and "surprising" music. Scala also aims for more speech content – or more "storytelling" – than Classic FM or BBC Radio 3.

History

On 22 December 2018, following the demise of his BBC Radio 2 drivetime showwhich had been co-hosted with Jo Whiley since May 2018Simon Mayo revealed that "...the new radio show will be announced in January. It will be startling."

A month later, on 21 January 2019, Bauer Radio announced plans to launch a new national classical music service under the name Scala Radio from March, with Mayo having signed up to be one of the lead presenters of the new station. More information about presenters and their shows was confirmed in February 2019.

Scala Radio launched at 10am on 4 March 2019 with Simon Mayo hosting the first live programme. The first track played was the prélude to Carmen Suite No. 1 by Georges Bizet.

Advance weekly listings for Scala Radio were published from launch in Radio Times and the Bauer-owned Total TV Guide. The Radio Times removed listings for BBC Radio 1Xtra and details of news and weather bulletins on Radios 1 and 2 to make space for the new station.

The station launched on Sky on 1 May 2019 on channel 0216 (later moved to channel 0151). It was removed on 14 December 2022, and was replaced by sister station Greatest Hits Radio on the platform.

Presenters
The presenters on Scala Radio include a range of radio and television personalities, some of whom have previously presented on other Bauer stations, as well as with competitor stations such as Classic FM. The current presenters with regular shows are:

 Richard Allinson
 Angellica Bell
 Jamie Crick
 Alexis Ffrench
 Mark Forrest
 Luci Holland – presents The Console which features video games music
 Sam Hughes
 Mark Kermode
 Simon Mayo
 Charles Nove
 Jack Pepper
 Penny Smith

Former presenters

 
 Gemma Cairney
 DJ Spoony
 Goldie
 Sister Bliss
 William Orbit
 Chris Rogers
 Anthea Turner
 Midge Ure

Audience
According to RAJAR data, the station has a weekly reach of 233,000 people as of December 2022.

References

External links
 
 

Bauer Radio
Classical music radio stations
Radio stations in the United Kingdom
Classical music in the United Kingdom
Radio stations established in 2019
2019 establishments in the United Kingdom